"Heaven Can Wait" is a 1988 song performed by German singer Sandra and written by Michael Cretu, Hubert Kemmler (known as Hubert Kah), Markus Löhr and Klaus Hirschburger. It was arranged by Michael Cretu and Markus Löhr, and produced by Cretu. The song was released as the lead single from Sandra's third studio album Into a Secret Land in mid-1988. The single reached the top 10 in Austria and France, the top 20 in Germany and Switzerland and was one of Sandra's few singles to break into the UK Top 100. In Austria, it was also a top 10 airplay hit. It was Sandra's fourth and last silver-certified single in France.

The music video was directed by DoRo (Rudi Dolezal and Hannes Rossacher) in Ibiza. The clip was released on Sandra's VHS video compilation 18 Greatest Hits in 1992 as well as the 2003 DVD The Complete History.

In 1999, a remix of the song was released on Sandra's compilation My Favourites. The track was remixed again for her 2006 compilation Reflections.

Formats and track listings
 7" single
A. "Heaven Can Wait" — 4:05
B. "Heaven's Theme" (Instrumental) — 4:05

 12" maxi single & CD maxi single
A. "Heaven Can Wait" (Extended Version) — 7:38
B1. "Heaven Can Wait" (Dub Mix) — 4:01
B2. "Heaven Can Wait" (Single Version) — 4:05

Charts

Weekly charts

Year-end charts

Certifications

References

External links
 "Heaven Can Wait" at Discogs
 The official Sandra YouTube channel

1988 singles
1988 songs
Sandra (singer) songs
Song recordings produced by Michael Cretu
Songs written by Hubert Kemmler
Songs written by Klaus Hirschburger
Songs written by Markus Löhr
Songs written by Michael Cretu
Virgin Records singles